The 2010–11 Talk 'N Text Tropang Texters season is the 21st season of the franchise in the Philippine Basketball Association (PBA).

Key dates
August 29: The 2010 PBA Draft took place in Fort Bonifacio, Taguig.

Draft picks

Roster

Philippine Cup

Eliminations

Standings

Finals

Commissioner's Cup

Eliminations

Standings

Finals

Governors Cup

Eliminations

Standings

Semifinals

Standings

Finals

Transactions

Pre-season

Trades

Free agents

Additions

Imports recruited

References

TNT Tropang Giga seasons
Talk 'N Text